"Let's Build a World Together" is a love song by George Jones and Tammy Wynette.  It was the married couple's fourth single together on Epic Records and became the title track of their fourth LP in 1973.  Although the song expressed the promise of new love, 1973 would be the beginning of the end as far as their marriage was concerned, with Wynette filing for divorce for the first time in August of that year. Their tumultuous personal life, which often made the gossip papers, coupled with their flawless vocal harmonies on love songs like "Let's Build a World Together," mesmerized their fans.  Indeed, the more their lives deteriorated, the bigger hits the couple would have, especially after their 1975 divorce.  However, "Let's Build a World Together" was a very minor hit at best, only making it to #32 on the Billboard singles chart.  Co-writer George Richey became Wynette's fifth husband.

Chart performance

References

1973 songs
Songs written by Billy Sherrill
Songs written by George Richey
Songs written by Norro Wilson
Song recordings produced by Billy Sherrill
Epic Records singles
Tammy Wynette songs
George Jones songs
Male–female vocal duets